Long Pond is located east of Brant Lake, New York. Fish species present in the lake are brook trout, tiger trout, and brown bullhead. There is a carry down trail from Padanaram Road on the south shore.

References

Lakes of New York (state)
Lakes of Warren County, New York